Alexandria Township may refer to:

 Alexandria Township, Leavenworth County, Kansas, in Leavenworth County, Kansas
 Alexandria Township, Douglas County, Minnesota
 Alexandria Township, New Jersey
 Alexandria township, Divide County, North Dakota, in Divide County, North Dakota

Township name disambiguation pages